Greg Austin (born 14 June 1963) is an Australian former rugby league and rugby union footballer who played in the 1980s and 1990s. A prolific try scorer, Austin spent the majority of his playing career in England.

Career
Born in Sydney, Austin was one of several overseas' players who joined Rochdale Hornets in the mid 1980s. He then moved to Salford, scoring 25 tries in 48 games for the club between 1986 and 1988. Whilst at Salford, he returned to Australia during the summer months to play for Manly-Warringah. In 1989, Austin signed for Hull Kingston Rovers.

Austin scored seven tries in four games at the start of the 1990–91 season, but in September 1990, following the signing of James Goulding, Austin was released by Hull KR so that the club could include Goulding in their overseas quota. He was signed by Halifax later that month. He went on to score a further 40 tries in 30 appearances with Halifax during that season, giving him a total of 47 tries during the season, the second highest total behind Martin Offiah. He repeated the feat in the following season, finishing as the second-highest try scorer with a total of 33.

In April 1993, Austin scored his 100th try for Halifax against Widnes in his last appearance for the club. He left the club at the end of the season, dropping down a division to join Keighley. He re-joined Salford in 1994 until the end of the season, before being signed by Huddersfield later that year.

In November 1994, Austin played in Huddersfield's club and league record 142–4 win in a first-round Regal Trophy against Blackpool Gladiators, with Austin scoring nine tries – one short of Lionel Cooper's club record of ten tries scored in a match. In 1996, Austin switched codes and joined rugby union side Leicester Tigers.

Personal life
Austin is the father of the association footballer; Mitch Austin.

References

External links
Career statistics at Rugby League Project
Career statistics at Statbunker

1963 births
Living people
Australian expatriate rugby league players
Australian expatriate rugby union players
Australian expatriate sportspeople in England
Australian expatriate sportspeople in Italy
Australian rugby league players
Australian rugby union players
Buccaneers RFC players
Expatriate rugby league players in England
Expatriate rugby union players in England
Expatriate rugby union players in Ireland
Expatriate rugby union players in Italy
Halifax R.L.F.C. players
Huddersfield Giants players
Hull Kingston Rovers players
Keighley Cougars players
Leicester Tigers players
Manly Warringah Sea Eagles players
Rochdale Hornets players
Rotherham Titans players
Rugby league centres
Rugby league players from Sydney
Rugby union centres
Salford Red Devils players